Nick van Woert is an American artist from Reno, Nevada. He currently lives and works in Brooklyn, New York. He studied architecture (BArch) at the University of Oregon and Fine Arts (MFA) at Parsons the New School for Design in New York.

Solo exhibitions
 2016 Violence, Gemeentemuseum Den Haag, The Hague, NL
 2015 Just Dropped In To See What Condition My Condition Was In, Moran Bondaroff, LA
 2015 Pink Elephants On Parade, Sheppard Gallery, University of Nevada, Reno
 2014 Nature Calls, MAMbo , Bologna, Italy
 2014 Hunky Dory Honky Tonk, Grimm Gallery, Amsterdam, NL
 2014 Pulverizer, Sheppard Gallery, University of Nevada, Reno
 2013 Labyrinth, L&M, Los Angeles
 2013 Haruspex, Yvon Lambert, Paris
 2013 No Man's Land, OHWOW, Los Angeles
 2012 Improvised Munition, Grimm Gallery, Amsterdam, NL
 2011 Anatomy, Yvon Lambert, Paris
 2011 Terra Amata, FIAF, New York
 2011 Breaking And Entering, Yvon Lambert, New York
 2010 She-Wolf, Grimm Gallery, Amsterdam, NL

Awards and recognition
 Zabludowicz Collection Artist in Residence, Sarvisalo, Finland (2010)
 Parsons MFA Fine Arts Valedictorian (2007)
 ISC Outstanding Student Achievement in Contemporary Sculpture
 31st GNMH AWARD

References

External links
 
 Nick van Woert at Grimm Gallery
 Q+A with Nick van Woert in Art in America 
 Interview with Nick van Woer in Flash Art Online
 Nine to watch on Artinfo

1979 births
Living people
Businesspeople from Brooklyn
Businesspeople from Reno, Nevada
Parsons School of Design alumni
University of Oregon alumni